Indosquilla is a monotypic genus of crustaceans belonging to the monotypic family Indosquillidae. The only species is Indosquilla manihinei.

The species is found in Indian Ocean.

References

Stomatopoda
Monotypic crustacean genera